Pseudogynoxys benthamii is a species of the genus Pseudogynoxys and family Asteraceae.  It is a native of Argentina, Bolivia and Paraguay.

References

External links

Flora of Bolivia
Flora of Paraguay
Flora of Argentina
benthamii
Plants described in 1950
Taxa named by Ángel Lulio Cabrera